is a national university in Japan. The main campus is located in Tsushima-Naka, Okayama, Okayama Prefecture.

The school was founded in 1870 and it was established as a university in 1949.

History 
In 1888 it was merged into a national school,  to constitute the Medical Faculty. The Medical Faculty became an independent school in 1901 and was renamed , a four-year medical school for men ages 17–21 or above.

In 1949, after World War II, the college was merged with other national and public colleges in Okayama Prefecture to establish Okayama University, under Japan's new education system.

The new campus (Tsushima Campus) was the former camp of the Imperial Japanese Army (the 17th Division). After occupation army left the camp in 1947, the students of the Sixth Higher School (whose buildings were burnt in the war) guarded the camp, residing in the former military barracks. Later, the camp became their campus. The faculties of Okayama University, except the Medical School, were gradually relocated to Tsushima Campus.

The university at first had five faculties: Law and Letters, Education, Science, Agriculture and Medicine. The latter history of the university is as follows:
1951:  joined the university.
Later reorganized into the Institute for Agricultural and Biological Sciences (in 1953) and then the Research Institute for Bioresources (in 1988).
1960: the Faculty of Engineering was established.
1967: Professor Jun Kobayashi (analytic chemistry, Faculty of Agriculture) announced the cause of Itai-itai disease as cadmium poisoning. Itai-itai disease (meaning "ouch ouch" disease in Japanese), was a severe pain disease affecting Toyama Prefecture as a result of mining over the course of 1,500 years.
1976: the Faculty of Pharmaceutical Sciences was established.
1979: the Dental School was established (in Shikata Campus).
1980: the Faculty of Law and Letters was divided into three faculties: Letters, Law and Economics.
1994: the Faculty of Environmental Science and Technology was established.

Academics 
 Faculty of Letters
 Faculty of Education
 Faculty of Law
 Faculty of Economics
 Faculty of Science
 Medical School
 Dental School
 Faculty of Pharmaceutical Sciences
 Faculty of Engineering
 Faculty of Environmental Science and Technology
 Faculty of Agriculture
 Matching Program Course
 Discovery Program for Global Learners (English-medium program)

Faculty of Law
In 1949, Okayama University set up the department of law, economics and literature at the same time as the university was founded. In those days, this was the only faculty of law in the region of Chugoku and Shikoku. Later in 1980, Okayama University reorganized the department and separated the faculty of law which became the department of law today. Then, in 2004, Okayama University reorganized again when the law graduate course was established.

Faculty of Economics: Department of Economics (including evening course)

Modern Economic Analysis

International Comparative Economics

Management and Accounting

Students who take this course work in administration, including management, organization, and strategy, and in accounting and financing, Students come to understand and develop insights into actual company operations. This course has students who want to be a certified public accountant or a licensed tax accountant.

Faculty of Science
Department of Mathematics
Department of Physics
Department of Chemistry
Department of Biology
Department of Earth Sciences
Medical School (in Shikata Campus)

Faculty of Medicine

Faculty of Health Sciences
Department of Nursing
Department of Radiological Technology
Department of Medical Technology

Dental School (in Shikata Campus)
 School of Dentistry

Faculty of Pharmaceutical Sciences
Department of Pharmacy
Department of Pharmaceutical Technology

Faculty of Engineering
Department of Mechanical and Systems Engineering
Department of Electrical and Communication Engineering
Department of Information Technology 
Department of Applied Chemistry and Biotechnology 
Center for Engineering Innovation

Faculty of Environmental Science and Technology

Environmental science and technology has four departments: Environmental and Mathematical Sciences, Environmental and Civil Engineering, Environmental Management Engineering, and Environmental Chemistry and Materials.

The environmental science and technology faculty began in 1995.

Faculty of Agriculture

Department of Agricultural Sciences

Matching Program Course
This is cross-faculty program designed to help students create their own integrated program matching individual career and academic interests. Students can take classes from other faculties which they are interested in and original classes in this course, so students can decide their major after thinking through many experiences.

Graduate schools 
 Graduate School of Education (Master's courses/Professional Degree Course)
 Graduate School of Humanities and Social Sciences (Master's/Doctoral)
 Graduate School of Natural Science and Technology (Master's/Doctoral)
 Graduate School of Health Sciences (Master's/Doctoral)
 Graduate School of Environmental and Life Science (Master's/Doctoral)
 Graduate School of Medicine, Dentistry and Pharmaceutical Sciences (Master's/Doctoral)
 School of Law

Attached Institute 
 Research Institute for Bioresources

Nationwide Joint-use Facility 
 Institute for Study of the Earth's Interior

Campuses
Each campus is in the central part of Okayama-city, except the Misasa Campus

Tsushima Campus

Tsushima Campus has an Administrative Center at 1-1, Tsushima-Naka, 1-chome, Kita-Ku, Okayama/1-1, Tsushima-Naka, 2-chome, Kita-Ku, Okayama/1-1, Tsushima-Naka, 3-chome, Kita-Ku, Okayama/1-62, Tsushima-Kuwanokicho, Kita-Ku, Okayama

Shikata Campus

5-1, Shikata-cho, 2-chome, Kita-Ku, Okayama

Misasa Campus

827, Yamada, Misasa, Tottori Prefecture

Academic rankings

Notable alumni
Sahachiro Hata - nomination for the Nobel Prize in Physiology or Medicine in 1913.
Seiki Yoshioka -  professional wrestler for Pro Wrestling Noah. Achieved a pharmaceutical qualification.

Note

References 

Japanese national universities
Okayama
Universities and colleges in Okayama Prefecture
Kansai Collegiate American Football League
1870 establishments in Japan
Educational institutions established in 1870